Avalanche  is a 1978 American disaster film directed by Corey Allen and starring Rock Hudson, Mia Farrow, Robert Forster and Jeanette Nolan.

Plot 
  
David Shelby is the wealthy owner of a new ski resort nestled below a snow-covered mountain. He invites his ex-wife, Caroline Brace, to come to the resort for the grand opening, which also kicks off a ski tournament and a figure skating competition. Among the many guests is David's feisty mother, Florence, Bruce Scott, a world-famous ski champion, and two rival figure skaters.

Caroline, a magazine reporter, divorced David as he is a control freak, but David invited her to the resort in an attempt to rekindle their marriage. David has to be "King of the Mountain" and opened the resort in what was considered uninhabitable country due to the heavy avalanches. McDade, the timid bookkeeper, explains to Florence that David had to negotiate with land developers and put his own money into building the resort. While taking her on a tour of the grounds, McDade runs into Nick Thorne, an environmental photographer who claims the resort is environmentally unsafe due to the heavy snowfall scheduled to arrive, but his protests are ignored. Caroline finds herself becoming attracted to Nick, which only infuriates David and brings out his controlling side.

Due to considerable red tape involved in the resort's construction, David urges one of his business partners to fly in to settle matters despite the snow. He hosts a large party in the resort the night of the opening, where everyone dances and drinks the night away. After confronting David over his controlling nature, Caroline runs into Nick, and they go off together to Nick's cabin. The snowfall increases as the night goes on, adding more weight to the mountain. The next morning sees the start of the ski and figure skating events, and Nick leaves Caroline in the cabin to shoot some of the fresh snow off of the mountain with a snow gun to avoid an avalanche.

Unfortunately, the plane carrying David's business partner crashes into the mountain due to low visibility, starting an avalanche. Tons of snow roll down the mountain, destroying the ski ramp, the skating rink, and the resort, resulting in an immense loss of life. David gets trapped at the skating rink but manages to dig himself out. He makes it to the resort, where McDade and Florence are trapped under a staircase in the dining room. A gas leak in the kitchen causes an explosion, injuring more people and taking out the phone lines. The nearest town's fire department comes to the rescue, bringing a camera crew to document the destruction. Bruce manages to ski away from the impending avalanche, but is buried alive. The ski ramp is destroyed, and everyone is buried except for a boy named Jason and Mark Elliott, a television host. The two are stuck in a partly collapsed ski ramp chair, dangling in the air.

Caroline sees the avalanche from the cabin and heads to the resort, meeting up with David. After dynamiting and digging through the snow, they come across McDade and Florence, who is near death due to hypothermia. Caroline resuscitates her through mouth-to-mouth and accompanies her on the ride to the hospital. Bruce, still alive, is found by a team of search and rescue people and is carried off in critical condition. David and a group from the fire department go to the ski ramp to rescue Jason and Mark, telling them to fall into the safety trampoline. Jason goes first and is safe, but the metal rope drags across the pulley and causes an electrical shock, electrocuting Mark.

Another ambulance arrives as David and Nick load body bags into a truck. The driver tells David the bridge leading to the hospital is still unsafe due to the snow. Realizing that Caroline and Florence are heading that way, Nick and David drive off to intercept them. The ambulance carrying the women skids over a patch of ice and careens off the road, throwing Caroline out. The vehicle crashes into a gorge under the bridge, killing the driver and Florence. David and Nick make it to the scene minutes later to find Caroline clinging to the bridge's collapsed railing hanging over the ledge. The men work together to pull Caroline up, David tying a rope around her and Nick pulling her to safety. The three then look on as the ambulance continues to burn under them.

Caroline arrives at the destroyed resort to say goodbye to David before leaving. She runs into Nick, who is also leaving; he says it will take years to reclaim everything buried in the snow. Nick tells her he likes her just like she is, and they part on good terms. Caroline goes inside the resort and has a final word with David, who admits that the entire incident is his fault, surprising Caroline. She tells him that she loves him and then departs, leaving David alone with the destruction of his accomplishments.

Cast 
Rock Hudson — David Shelby
Mia Farrow — Caroline Brace
Robert Forster — Nick Thorne
Jeanette Nolan — Florence Shelby
Rick Moses — Bruce Scott
Steve Franken — Henry McDade
Barry Primus — Mark Elliott
Cathey Paine — Tina Elliott
Jerry Douglas — Phil Prentiss
Antony Carbone – Leo the Coach
X Brands – Marty Brenner

Production 
The film was originally budgeted at $6.5 million, but producer Roger Corman cut that amount before production began. It was directed by Corey Allen, who had previously made the film Thunder and Lightning for Corman. Allen himself rewrote Gavin Lambert's script extensively and received a script credit. (Lambert later claimed Allen "dewrote" the script.)

However, Allen was unhappy with the budget cuts and stated that "I don't feel the aims of the film were fulfilled . . . there were heavy pressures on Paul [Rapp, the line producer,] to bring the film in ahead of schedule, and these I feel were detrimental to the film."

The film was shot at the Purgatory Resort north of Durango, Colorado over an eight-week period. The ski scenes were at Purgatory Ski Resort. The avalanche scenes, in which the people are indoors, were filmed at The Lodge at Tamarron, south of Purgatory. At least one scene was filmed in Durango with the Gaslight Movie Theater in the background, at which one of the premier showings of the film was held.

Reception 
Avalanche was one of the most expensive films ever made by New World Pictures and was not a success at the box office.

The film came out at the same time as New World's Piranha. Corman says that New World thought Avalanche would be more of a success because "it was more mainstream" and had bigger stars; however, Piranha was the bigger hit. In hindsight, Corman says this was because Piranha was "funny and very well directed".

Audiences actually laughed at some of the scenes in the film, especially where it was obvious that styrofoam was used for snow.  Even at that time, the special effects could have been produced much more skillfully than they were in this film.

Legacy
John Wilson, founder of the Golden Raspberry Awards, included Avalanche among the 100 Most Enjoyably Bad Movies Ever Made in The Official Razzie Movie Guide. The film was riffed in the 2017 revival of Mystery Science Theater 3000.

References

External links 
 
 
 
 Said MST3K episode on IMDb

1978 films
1970s disaster films
American disaster films
1970s English-language films
1978 action films
New World Pictures films
Avalanches in film
Films directed by Corey Allen
Films produced by Roger Corman
1970s American films